Eduardo Gerolami (born 10 March 1952) is a Uruguayan former football defender who played professionally in Uruguay, Spain and Mexico.

Career
Born in Salto, Gerolami began playing football as a central defender with a local selection and turned professional with Montevideo side Club Nacional de Football in 1970. He played for the reserve team and was loaned to Montevideo Wanderers F.C. before returning to play for Nacional's first team in 1974.

In 1975, Gerolami moved to Spain to play for Segunda División side Recreativo de Huelva. In three seasons, he helped the club gain promotion to La Liga. Shortly after, he was signed by Andalusian side Sevilla FC for two seasons.

After falling out of favor with Sevilla, Gerolami moved to Mexico, joining Mexican Primera División side Atletas Campesinos for two seasons. He injured his Achilles tendon and returned to Uruguay where he attempted a second stint with Montevideo Wanderers but had to retire due to the injury.

References

External links
 
 
 

1952 births
Living people
Uruguayan footballers
Uruguayan expatriate footballers
Club Nacional de Football players
Montevideo Wanderers F.C. players
Recreativo de Huelva players
Sevilla FC players
Querétaro F.C. footballers
Uruguayan Primera División players
La Liga players
Segunda División players
Liga MX players
Expatriate footballers in Mexico
Expatriate footballers in Spain
Uruguayan expatriate sportspeople in Mexico
Uruguayan expatriate sportspeople in Spain
Association football defenders
Footballers from Salto, Uruguay